"Candidatus Bartonella melophagi" is a candidatus species of Bartonella that causes infection in humans.

References

Bartonellaceae
Candidatus taxa